Pullur may refer to:

Indian villages
Pullur, Kasaragod, in Kerala state
Pullur, Malappuram, in Kerala state
Pullur, Telangana, in Medak district, Telangana state
Pullur, Thrissur, in Kerala state

See also 
 Pulur (disambiguation)